Garra mondica is a species of cyprinid fish in the genus Garra endemic to the Mond River in Iran.

References 

Garra
Fish described in 2015